| tries = {{#expr:
 + 7 + 6 + 6 + 6 + 9 + 8 + 6 
 + 9 + 12 + 10 + 6 + 8 + 7
 + 9 + 11 + 7 + 7 + 8 + 8 + 9 
 + 10 + 10  + 13 + 6 + 8 + 9 + 8
 + 10 + 11 + 13 + 7 + 5 + 8 + 9 
 + 5 + 4 + 13 + 4 + 7 + 7 + 5 
 + 3 + 11 + 3 + 5 + 8 + 10 + 10 
 + 6 + 6 + 10 + 2 + 8 + 9 + 9 
 + 9 + 8 + 3 + 4 + 2 + 9 + 7 
 + 8 + 8 + 7 + 8 + 10 + 5 + 11 
 + 9
 + 5 + 14 + 7 + 9 + 10 + 6 + 12 
 + 6 + 8 + 9 + 10 + 8 + 7 + 13 
 + 4 + 3
 + 6 + 5
 + 6 + 10 + 5 + 6 + 5 + 7 + 6 
 + 6 + 8 + 5 + 4 + 5 + 11 + 10 
 + 12 + 5 
 + 9 + 8 + 11 + 8 + 6 + 9 + 8 
 + 11 + 10 + 16 + 10 + 7 + 9
 + 7 + 5 + 9 + 9
 + 12 + 9 + 3 + 12 + 4 + 9 + 11
 + 6 + 11 + 9 + 7 + 10 + 11 + 11
 + 9 + 8 + 8 + 9 + 8 + 8 + 9 
 + 13 + 9 + 5 + 5 + 6 + 8 + 13 
 
 
 
 
}}
| top point scorer = 181 – Henry Anscombe (Dorking)
| top try scorer   = 27 – Curtis Barnes (Worthing Raiders) 
| prevseason       = 2021–22
| nextseason       = 2023–24
}}

The 2022–23 National League 2 East is the first season of the fourth-tier (east) of the English domestic rugby union competitions; one of three at this level. The others are National League 2 North and National League 2 West. Previously, there were two leagues at level four; National League 2 North and National League 2 South.

Structure
The league consists of fourteen teams who play the others on a home and away basis, to make a total of 26 matches each. The champions are promoted to National League 1. The bottom two teams are relegated to Regional 1 South Central or Regional 1 South East.

The results of the matches contribute points to the league as follows:
 4 points are awarded for a win
 2 points are awarded for a draw
 0 points are awarded for a loss, however
 1 losing (bonus) point is awarded to a team that loses a match by 7 points or fewer
 1 additional (bonus) point is awarded to a team scoring 4 tries or more in a match.

Participating teams and locations

League table

Fixtures & results
Fixtures for the season were announced by the RFU on 13 June 2022.

Round 1

Round 2

Round 3

Round 4

Round 5

Round 6

Round 7

Round 8

Round 9

Round 10

Rescheduled match

Round 11

Round 12

Round 13

Round 14

Round 15

Round 16

Round 17

Round 18

Rescheduled matches

Rescheduled matches (Round 14)

Round 19

Round 20

Round 21

Round 22

Rescheduled matches

Notes

References

External links
 NCA Rugby

4E
National League 2 East
4E